The 2015 Sam Houston State Bearkats football team represented Sam Houston State University in the 2015 NCAA Division I FCS football season. The Bearkats were led by second-year head coach K. C. Keeler and played their home games at Bowers Stadium. They were a member of the Southland Conference. They finished the season 11–4 overall and 7–2 in Southland play to finish in a tie for second place. They received an at-large bid to the FCS Playoffs where they defeated Southern Utah, McNeese State, and Colgate to advance to the Semifinals, where they lost to Jacksonville State. The 2015 season marked the Bearkats' 100th season of football.

Schedule

Game summaries

@ Texas Tech

Sources:

Lamar

Sources:

Houston Baptist

Sources:

Stephen F. Austin

Sources:

The Sam Houston State Bearkats faced the Stephen F. Austin State Lumberjacks for the 90th time in the two teams history. The Bearkats led the all-time series 52–35–2 going into the game.

The first quarter featured several long drives by both teams but neither managed to get on the scoreboard, including a missed field goal by SHSU kicker Luc Swimberghe. However, the Lumberjacks worked their way down the field before the end of the quarter, culminating in a twenty one yard touchdown scoring pass by SFA quarterback Zach Conque to Lumberjack wide receiver De'Quann Ruffin in the opening seconds of the second quarter. With SFA kicker Mason Juhl's extra point, SFA led 7–0. After some more back and forth between the teams, Sam Houston eventually got on the board with a thirty five yard field goal by Swimberghe with 5:30 remaining in the quarter, narrowing SFA's lead to 7–3. SFA struck back quickly with a thirty one yard touchdown pass from Conque to wide receiver Judah Jones at the 4:10 mark, and with the extra point the teams went to half time with SFA leading 14–3.

On SHSU's first possession of the second half, Bearkats wide receiver Gerald Thomas returned a punt seventy eight yards for a score, and with Swimberge's extra point the Bearkats narrowed the gap to 14–10 at the 13:14 mark. On Sam Houston's next possession, the drive ended with 9:16 remaining in the quarter with a four-yard scoring run by SHSU running back Donovan Williams to but the Bearkats on top 17–14. SFA's next possession ended in a one-yard scoring rush by Conque to put SFA back on top 21–17. SHSU had another long punt return with wide receiver Yedidiah Louis bringing the ball in 53 yards for a score with 3:01 remaining in the quarter, and SHSU retook the lead 24–21. The third quarter ended with SHSU leading 24–21.

SHSU scored again early in the fourth quarter with a one-yard run by running back Corey Avery at the 13:12 mark, lifting the Bearkat lead to 31–21. The Bearkats failed to take advantage of a three-and-out by the Lumberjacks, with a forty seven yard punt return by Louis setting the Kats up in the red zone, but a field goal by Swimberge bounced off the upright. SFA struck back quickly with an eighty-yard scoring rush by Lumberjack running back Lon Easily on the first play of their possession, narrowing the lead to 31–28 Bearkats. Another Bearkat field goal by Swimberge stretched the lead to 34–28, where it stayed through the end of the game.

Incarnate Word

Sources:

@ Abilene Christian

Sources:

Nicholls (Homecoming)

Sources:

Texas A&M–Commerce

Sources:

@ McNeese State

Sources:

Northwestern State

Sources:

@ Central Arkansas

Sources:

FCS playoffs

First round – Southern Utah

Sources:

Second round – McNeese State

Sources:

Quarterfinals–Colgate

Sources:

Semifinals–Jacksonville State

Sources:

Ranking movements

References

Sam Houston State
Sam Houston Bearkats football seasons
Sam Houston State
Sam Houston State Bearkats football